Zasosna is a rural locality (a khutor) in Olshanskoye Rural Settlement, Ostrogozhsky District, Voronezh Oblast, Russia. The population was 78 as of 2010. There are 2 streets.

Geography 
Zasosna is located 19 km southwest of Ostrogozhsk (the district's administrative centre) by road. Nizhny Olshan is the nearest rural locality.

References 

Rural localities in Ostrogozhsky District